Permindar Kaur (born 1965, Nottingham) is a visual artist. She was included in the British Art Show in 1996. She is shortlisted for the Freelands Award 2022 for her upcoming exhibition at John Hansard Gallery.

Life and education 
Kaur was born in Nottingham to Punjabi parents. She gained a BA from Sheffield City Polytechnic in 1989, an MA from Glasgow School of Art in 1992 and spent several years in Barcelona in the early 1990s.

Career and work 
Kaur emerged to prominence during the 1990s. Her work is often concerned with themes surrounding the home, domestic life and childhood. The structure of the house itself frequently appears in her sculpture in works such as Overgrown House (2020). Items of domestic furniture such as beds and chairs also appear, often in outsized or distorted forms, resulting in an effect that is slightly ‘disconcerting’ or ‘unnerving’ as art historian Eddie Chambers has noted.

Selected exhibitions

Solo exhibitions 

 Permindar Kaur: Outgrown, The Art House, Wakefield (3 September – 13 November 2022)
 Independent Thoughts: New work by Permindar Kaur, Nottingham Castle Museum and Art Gallery (27 March - 24 May 1998)
 Cold Comfort, shown in two parts at Ikon Gallery, Birmingham and Mead Gallery, Coventry (18 May 1996 – 22 June 1996). Toured to Bluecoat Gallery, Liverpool (27 July – 31 August 1996)

Group exhibitions 

 Permindar Kaur, Ranya Abdulateef and Ifa Mesfin Abebe: Dream Runner, Wakefield Cathedral (28 September – 13 November 2022)
 What Lies Beneath: Women, Politics, Textiles, New Hall Art Collection, Cambridge (17 February – 28 August 2022)
 Animals & Us, Turner Contemporary, Margate (25 May – 30 September 2018)
 Tread Softly, Yorkshire Sculpture Park, Wakefield (27 May – 15 October 2017)
 Invisible Cities, Fruitmarket Gallery, Edinburgh (8 – 22 February 1992)
 Four X 4, Arnolfini, Bristol (12 October – 24 November 1991)
 Let the Canvas Come to Life With Dark Faces, Herbert Art Gallery and Museum, Coventry (14 April – 29 May 1990) and touring.

Collections 
Permindar Kaur's work is part of the following collections:

 Arts Council, England
 British Council, UK
 New Art Hall Collection, Cambridge
 Cartwright Hall, Bradford
 Nottingham Castle Museum, Nottingham

Further reading 

 Alice Correia, 'Permindar Kaur: Locating a "Black" Artist in Narratives of British Art in the 1990s', Art History, June 2021

References 

English contemporary artists
Living people
1965 births